The 2011–12 season is FC Basel's 119th in existence and the club's 18th consecutive season in the top flight of Swiss football. FC Basel started their season with various warm-up matches against teams from Switzerland, Germany, Georgia, France and Romania and played against Hertha BSC and West Ham United at the 2011 Uhrencup in Grenchen. This season, Basel earned the so-called "Title Hattrick", that is, three consecutive Swiss Super League championships. They won the Swiss Cup after defeating FC Luzern in the final, and reached the knockout phase of the Champions League, losing to the eventual finalists Bayern Munich 1–7 on aggregate.

Club

FC Basel Holding AG
The FC Basel Holding AG (Holding) owns 75% of the club FC Basel (FC Basel 1893 AG) and the other 25% is owned by the club and its members. Chairwoman of the Holding was Gisela Oeri. She owned 91.96% of the Holding's shares. The other 8,04% of the shares were owned by a group of investors, these being Manor AG, J. Safra Sarasin, Novasearch AG, MCH Group AG and Weitnauer Holding AG. As chairwoman of the holding Ms Oeri was also chairwoman of the club. At the AGM Oeri announced that she was stepping down from her position of presiding the club. She handed her shares over to her vice chairman Bernhard Heusler, the finance chief Stephan Werthmüller and Sportdirector Georg Heitz.

Club management
To the beginning of the season the club's board of directors remained in the same constellation as in the previous season. Then at the club's Extraordinary General Assembly on 16 January 2012 the 601 attending members confirmed these three directors in their positions and Adrian Knup joined them to become new vice chairman. They also appointed Oeri as honorary president.

Team management

Overview
At the beginning of the season the German Thorsten Fink remained head-coach. It was to be his third consecutive season. His assistant was Heiko Vogel and fitness coach was Nikola Vidović. Fink brought three youngsters up from the U-21 team, being Arlind Ajeti, Roman Buess and Darko Jevtić. Two players returned after spending the previous season on loan, these were Fabian Frei after his loan to St. Gallen and Pascal Schürpf returned from Lugano. There were also a number of transfers, Radoslav Kováč came from West Ham United, Park Joo-ho transferred in from Júbilo Iwata, Pak Kwang-ryong from Wil and Stephan Andrist signed in from Thun. Two players signed in on free transfers, these being Kay Voser and Marcel Herzog.

At the end of the previous season the club did not renew the contracts with four players, who then had to leave. These were Beg Ferati, Behrang Safari, Matthias Baron and Dominik Ritter. Orhan Mustafi transferred to Grasshopper Club and Sandro Wieser transferred to 1899 Hoffenheim. Three players were loaned out to obtain more playing time, Fwayo Tembo to ES Sahel, Pascal Schürpf to Aarau and Taulant Xhaka to Grasshopper Club.

Another player who left the club was their captain and goalkeeper Franco Costanzo. Costanzo played for FC Basel for five years, in which time they won the Swiss Cup three times and the national Championship also three times. He also played twice in the Champions League group-stages. During this period, he played 141 league games, including cup and international UEFA games he had 199 club appearances. He played his last match for the team on 25 May 2011 and was substituted out in the 87th minute to a standing ovation. He was replaced by his designated successor Yann Sommer.

Head coach Thorsten Fink left the club and on 13 October he signed a contract with Hamburger SV to manage the German Bundesliga club through to 2014. Fink took the coach of Basel's U-21 team Patrick Rahmen with him as his assistant. As replacement for Fink, the club chose his former assistant Vogel, who served as caretaker manager until the winter break. Vogel's first three games in charge of the team were the Swiss Cup fixture on 15 October, a 5–1 away win against FC Schötz, the Champions League Group C fixture on 18 October 2011, a 0–2 home defeat against Benfica, and a 1–0 away win in the Super League against FC Zürich. On 7 December 2011, he guided Basel to the round of 16 in the  Champions League, defeating the 2011 runners-up Manchester United 2–1. After 11 games, four of which in the Champions League, with eight wins, two draws and only one defeat, it was announced on 12 December that Vogel had signed as head coach and manager. A few days later, it was also announced that Markus Hoffmann had been signed as an assistant.

On 31 August 2011, Liverpool had announced the release of Philipp Degen following his long-term calf injury. Just a short time later, he made the request to the then Basel manager Fink if he could keep fit with his home club's first team, which was granted. Fink left the club and his replacement Heiko Vogel offered Degen a contract which Degen signed on 20 November 2011.

The Campaign

Domestic league
Basel entered the 2011–12 Swiss Super League as defending champions, saving their one-point margin on FC Zürich by winning 3–0 against FC Luzern on the last day of the 2010–11 Swiss Super League. They began their season on 16 July in Bern against Young Boys. The start of the season was poor, with three draws and two defeats in the first six league matches. The team refound their strengths and things changed to the better. Basel then won ten and drew the other two of the next 12 games. The first half of the domestic season ended on 11 December with the home match against Neuchâtel Xamax. To this point, Basel remained as League leaders.

Basel continued their undefeated run in the domestic season and equaled the Swiss record of longest undefeated run (26 games) in the Swiss league (previously held by Grasshoppers) ironically by beating Grasshoppers 6–3 on 12 May 2012. Although they could not surpass the record, they still managed to defend their Super League title despite losing to Young Boys 2–1 on the final day of the season. As they have done in previous seasons, the title win was celebrated at Barfüsserplatz later that night. After retaining first place, Basel will enter the 2012–13 UEFA Champions League in the second round of qualification.

Conclusion
The team achieved their aim by winning the championship. The team ended the season with 78 goals scored and 33 goals against. They had the season's best attacking record and the second best defensive record. Alexander Frei was the team's top goal scorer with 24 goals and achieved his personal aim to become league top goal-scorer for the second consecutive year. Marco Streller was the team's second top scorer with 13 goals and he was also second in the league ranking. Third best scorer in the team was Xherdan Shaqiri with nine goals. He was third equal in the league ranking, together with Emmanuel Mayuka from the Young Boys, Vilmos Vanczák from FC Sion and Matías Vitkieviez who played for both Servette and YB. Jacques Zoua had scored seven league goals and Fabian Frei, Benjamin Huggel and Valentin Stocker had each scored four.

Domestic cup
Basel entered the 2011–12 Swiss Cup in the first round of the competition and the team's clear aim was to win the title. In the first round, teams from the Super League and Challenge League were seeded and could not play against each other. In a match, the home advantage was granted to the team from the lower league, if applicable.

Eschenbach (14 September 2011)
In the first round Basel were drawn against Amateur team FC Eschenbach, who at that time played in the 2. Liga, the fourth tier of Swiss football. The match was played in the Sportplatz Weiherhaus in Eschenbach LU with an attendance of 3,700 spectators. Head coach Thorsten Fink had mixed a number of their youngsters into the team, leaving a number of the regular players at home with a day-off. Although the hosts had the first shot at goal in the first minute, Basel started well, despite having difficulties with the poor condition of the pitch. It lasted only a few minutes before the inevitable occurred, following a long corner from Scott Chipperfield in the 11th minute Benjamin Huggel headed the ball back into the middle and Pak Kwang-Ryong scored his first goal for club. Basel dominated their opponents from then onwards, Stephan Andrist drove a long drive wide and then Jacques Zoua put the ball into the net, but was ruled off-side. In the 36th minute a fine cross from the left found Pak in the middle and his header put the favourites two up. In the following minutes the Eschenbach goalkeeper Amhof had to make a number of saves. To make things worse for him, in the 45th minute he committed a foul on Zoua as he came out too late and the fouled player himself sank the penalty-kick. In the second half Basel spooled the game out and Chipperfield added to the score, but the hosts were unable to achieve a consolation goal. The favourites won 4–0 to qualify for the next round.

Schötz (15 October 2011)
In the second round of the Cup the teams from the Super League were seeded and could not play each other. In the matches the home advantage was granted to the team from the lower league. Basel were drawn against Schötz. Schötz itself is just a small village with about 4,000 inhabitants, but the football club has written its name into the history of the competition before by beating bigger clubs many times before. An attendance of 2,800 visited the Sportplatz Wissenhusen, but the same the guests dominate play from the opening minutes. Stephan Andrist put his name on the score sheet after just 8 minutes and Benjamin Huggel doubled up on 34 minutes. In the 57th minute Andrist achieved his second and in the 79th Jacques Zoua scored Basel's fourth. In the 84th minute Schötz's right winger Koch achieved the consolation goal, but Basel's substitute Alexander Frei netted in the last minute of the game as Basel won 4–0 to qualify for the next round.

Wil (26 November 2011)
In the third round, the ties were drawn, there was no seeding, everyone could meet everyone. The home advantage was granted to the team from the lower league, otherwise to the team that was drawn first. Basel were drawn at away against Wil from the Challenge League. The match was played at the Stadion Bergholz in front of 4,400 spectators. Basel's head coach Thorsten Fink had given David Abraham, Benjamin Huggel and Marco Streller a free week-end, but the newly signed Philipp Degen was on the bench, ready to make his comeback. Even without these regular players in their starting line-up, Basel started well and in 8th minute after a short-played corner kick, Granit Xhaka played a cross into the centre and Fabian Frei ran into the space jumped high and headed his team into the lead. Basel dominated the game in the first half, a long range shot from the forwards moving defender Markus Steinhöfer was punched out by keeper Guillaume Faivre. As the second half began the hosts took over the game, created chances but were not successful. In the 60th minute a long ball into the Basel penalty area, from a quickly played free-kick for Wil and suddenly the attacking mid-fielder Sandro Lombardi collected the ball and was able to challenge Basel keeper Yann Sommer. However, the keeper felled the on running player and subsequently the whistle, and he was shown the red card, and the penalty was given. Granit Xhaka was called out and second keeper Massimo Colomba was substituted in before the penalty-kick could be taken. Džengis Čavušević took the spot-kick, but failed as Colomba reacted well and parried, to cause frustration for Čavušević. Basel had another good chance, but Jacques Zoua kicked his shot against the cross bar. Wil did not give up and in the 84th minute a long ball was not cleared by the Basel defence, Lombardi caught the loose ball and equalised with a low shot. The game went into extra time and Philipp Degen gave his comeback. In the 111th minute, the afore mentioned Čavušević, with a sly one-two pass, was played clear and he put the hosts a goal up. His frustration was relieved. However, two minutes later a free kick taken by Alexander Frei flew high into the goal mouth and was headed away, but not cleared. Degen controlled the loose ball and shot left footed beyond everybody in front of him into the goal for the 2–2 equaliser. Again a few minutes later, Park Joo-Ho's quick ball to Scott Chipperfield was sent on to Alex Frei, who lifted the ball over advancing keeper Faivre to give Basel the lead. In the last minute of the game the frustration was again great and players from both sides were involved in a scuffle and a number of players were pushed onto the ground. Basel's Genséric Kusunga and Wil's Čavušević were both shown the straight red card, but the result remained with Basel's 3–2 away win.

Lausanne-Sport (21 March 2012)
The winners of Round 3 played in the quarter-finals and the ties were drawn, there is no home advantage granted in the draw. Basel were drawn at home in the St. Jakob-Park against Lausanne-Sport. Referee was Cyril Zimmermann, the match attendance was 8,028 people and the pitch was brand new, it had been laid during the previous fortnight. The start phase was extremely dishevelled, with many bad passes and build-up errors. The first good move was in the 24th minute, a good diagonal ball to Valentin Stocker who advanced down the left and flanked towards Marco Streller. Lausanne defender Guillaume Katz tried to interrupt the play, but he steered the ball passed his own goalkeeper Anthony Favre. Basel then tried to double up, a good chance for Markus Steinhöfer, but his shot was slightly too high. Suddenly a long cross from the Lausanne right-back Abdelouahed Chakhsi and Jocelyn Roux headed the surprise equaliser just seconds before half-time. After the break Basel again dominated play, Philipp Degen with a long cross from the right towards the far post to captain Streller and his first-time left foot volley rocketed into the net. The guests now seemed uncertain and a left footed shot from Xherdan Shaqiri and as Streller tried to win the loose ball he was brought down. Alexander Frei converted the spot-kick. Lausanne didn't seem to have much to put against the home team, but then, after a clearance and a good ball into the centre and good pass out to the right and a good pass back. Basel's defence were not in contact with the play. Roux said thank you and put the ball into the net, 3–2. The Basel team pulled themselves together, played with more tempo and created further chances and a long distance left footed shot from Streller scraped the cross bar. In the 89th minute Frei laid the ball off for Gilles Yapi who outplayed the oncoming goalkeeper and played into the middle, Streller side footed the ball into the unguarded net. Lausanne had held on well, but in the later stages had run out of stamina. In the second minute of added time Fabian Frei added the fifth. Basel won 5–2 and qualified for the semi-final.

 Winterthur (15 April 2012)
Basel's opponents in the semi-final were lower tier FC Winterthur. The match was played in front of an attendance of 8,500 people which meant that the Stadion Schützenwiese was sold out. FCB started slowly into the game and FCW took control. A good move gave Luca Zuffi a chance, but his long-range shot was blocked by Basel keeper Yann Sommer. The rebound came to Radice and his effort forced the keeper to make another good save. The next chance after a good long-ball from Zuffi, was another shot from Radice, Sommer tipped the ball over the top. FCW had a few more chances, but then a mistake in their mid-field. A bad pass from Sven Lüscher, Alexander Frei pushed the ball into the box and captain Marco Streller made no mistake to put Basel one up with their first chance in the 38th minute. Two minutes before the break keeper Sommer was lucky not to have a seen a red card as he brought Kuzmanovic down, but referee Alain Bieri gave a yellow card to the forward for a dive. In the second half the underdogs had more of the match then the higher classed visitors and these were glad that their keeper had a good day. The offensive orientation of the FCW enabled the guests to counterattack. In a run two against two, Basel's substitute Xherdan Shaqiri played the ball clear to Frei, but he shot wide with only goalkeeper Christian Leite to beat. Winterthur continued to play forwards, as another counterattack happened and this time Frei was able to shoot into the goal as Shaqiri outplayed the keeper. In added time a slight push from Basel defender Aleksandar Dragović and this time referee Bieri gave the penalty kick, Kuzmanovic put it away. But Basel advanced with the 2–1 victory to the final.

Luzern (16 May 2012)
In winter like conditions, 30,100 fans watched an intense 87th Cup final in the Stade de Suisse, Wankdorf in Berne between FC Basel and FC Luzern. From the first minutes, FCL were the expected defiant opponents against an FCB who played in their best line-up. In the early stages, the Basel fans had to survive a few anxious minutes behind Yann Sommer's goal and they could thank the FCB goalkeeper for keeping the 0–0 at that stage. Heiko Vogel's team didn't even have a handful of scoring chances in the first half, with Valentin Stocker's shot from close range in the 26th minute being the highlight from the FCB point of view. FCL, for its part, was often a bit too complicated in the end. In the 55th minute, Alex Frei was able to take a free kick from the right side. His precise ball found Beni Huggel's head and landed in the net, unreachable for David Zibung. It was a wonderful goal, but it caused was a vigorous reaction from Luzern, which culminated in the 67th minute in the deserved equaliser, also per header, from Tomislav Puljić Because Basel did not get any reward for their final offensive, the game went into extra time. But these 30 minutes only had two mentionable scenes. First, Sommer miraculously saved an effort by Michel Renggli and secondly Radoslav Kovac 's intervention, as last man, against Adrian Winter could have been sanctioned. 

Thus, the dramatic evening culminated in the penalty shootout, in which Yann Sommer became the match winning hero. The FCB goalkeeper parried both Ohayon and Gygax's shot marvelously, while all the red and blue players converted their shots. Basel won the Swiss Cup 4–2 in the penalty shootout. This was Basel's 11th Swiss Cup title. Furthermore, nobody who watched or participated was surprised that Yann Sommer won the man of the match trophy.

Conclusion
The club's clear aim had been to win back the title that they had lost the previous season. They completed their aim and thus won the league and cup double.

Champions League
Basel's positioning in the 2010–11 Swiss Super League entered them directly into the group stage of the 2011–12 UEFA Champions League.

Group stage
The seeding and draw for this stage took take place on 25 August in Monaco. Teams were seeded into four pots based on their 2011 UEFA club coefficients. Basel were drawn in Group C with Benfica, Manchester United and Oțelul Galați, the first match was a home game on 14 September.

Oțelul Galați (14 September 2011)
With 30,126 fans the St. Jakob Park was not sold out on this warm and dry clear evening. During the early stages Basel had more ball possession, however, it was the visitors who created the clearer chances. In the second minute the Basel defence failed to clear the ball, but Gabriel Giurgiu shot too weakly straight into goalkeeper Yann Sommer's arms. Then in the sixth minute Liviu Antal broke down the right with tempo and crossed to Giurgiu, but Sommer saved his volley. Following these first two efforts, Basel took control and played patiently looking for an opening. Oțelul relied on counterattacks, but these were rare. Basel's biggest chance arose in the 27th minute as centre-back Milan Perendija failed to connect to Fabian Frei's long pass. The ball fell in the path of Alexander Frei, whose hard drive was well saved by keeper Branko Grahovac. Another big chance came in the 39th minute as Markus Steinhöfer took a quick throw in and caught the visiting defence open. Marco Streller out played Adrian Sălăgeanu as he cut-back behind the defender and then he sent a perfect cross in for Fabian Frei to head home. Oţelul responded well after the break, pressing forward. On 58 minutes they managed the equaliser, Liviu Antal fired a good shot, Sommer parried it, but the ball fell to Marius Pena and he chipped the ball over the keeper. Granit Xhaka and Alex Frei both with their opportunities and so it felt as though Basel were running out of time. Then as Streller had a chance in the 82nd minute, he was brought down by defender Sălăgeanu. Referee William Collum from the Scottish Football Association had no choice, showed the defender a straight red and awarded a penalty that Alex Frei converted. Finally Benjamin Huggel received a second yellow and was also dismissed with three minutes left.

Manchester United (27 September 2011)
Matchday 2 was played in Old Trafford on a cloudy evening in front of 73.115 fans. Referee was Paolo Tagliavento of the Italian Football Federation and he reported a damp pitch. Both teams started well, but two goals from Danny Welbeck in the 16th and 17th minutes looked to have put United in control. Welbeck's first goal came when he scuffed a shot in off the post, and the England forward's second was a far more convincing strike from Ryan Giggs' cross. Fabian Frei shot in off the post on 58 minutes to give Basel hope, and Alexander Frei's header, aided by awful defending from Rio Ferdinand, made it 2–2. With 15 minutes remaining, Basel were awarded a penalty and Alexander Frei sent David de Gea the wrong way to give Basel a shock lead and leave United on the brink of a first home defeat in almost 18 months. In the 90th minute, however, Ashley Young headed home Nani's cross at the back post to rescue a point. United could have earned all three points had substitute Dimitar Berbatov not shot into the side-netting rather than play it along the ground for a tap-in. Instead, United were forced to settle for a point, as they went down to third in Group C. This was the first time since 1999 that United had failed to win either of their first two Champions League group stage matches.

Benfica (18 October 2011)
Matchday 3 was played at home in the St. Jakob Park was played on a dry pitch, on a clear evening, in front of a sold-out 35,831 attendance. Referee was Viktor Kassai from the Hungarian Football Federation. In the early stages the teams were showing entertaining football, but Benfica goalkeeper Artur and Basel's Yann Sommer were more than equal to the attempts from Alexander Frei and Rodrigo. The first really good chance occurred in the 20th minute as the visitors made a quick breakthrough. Nicolás Gaitán broke forward as he played a quick one-two with fellow Argentinian Pablo Aimar. He then passed into the middle, Rodrigo let the ball pass, and Bruno César was free to shoot the ball beyond Sommer. The home side then pressed for a quick equaliser. Xherdan Shaqiri made himself space, passed to Marco Streller but he  could not beat keeper Artur with his hard low drive. Gaitán was the force behind Benfica's concise play and the same was true of Shaqiri for Basel. On 65 minutes Shaqiri found the free running Streller with a perfect timed pass, but again it was Artur who was well positioned to foil the striker's effort. Midway through the second period Benfica's coach Jorge Jesus brought on Nolito and Óscar Cardozo for Aimar and Rodrigo. Four minutes later Benjamin Huggel was shown a yellow card for a foul on Cardozo and the fouled striker slammed the free-kick beyond the reach of the keeper into the net. Basel were still coming forward in an attempt to get back into the game. Shaqiri running and running, shooting from range, shooting from close and then running at the Benfica defence again. He proved as being too quick for defender Emerson, who for his second bookable foul on the Basel winger was dismissed. Despite their efforts, the result remained 0–2.

Benfica (2 November 2011)
Matchday 4 was the return match in Estádio da Luz in front of 39,270 fans on a rainy evening. Benfica started very fast and their first chance, with less than a minute played, came as Pablo Aimar passed well between the Basel defenders to Rodrigo. But his shot was turned behind the post by keeper Yann Sommer. Aimer hit the resulting corner-kick high, but Nemanja Matić's header was punched away by Sommer. Then the Spanish striker Rodrigo gave the Portuguese team the perfect start with a fourth-minute volley, this time Sommer had no chance. Benfica suppressed the game, but Basel had more ball possession and significant territorial advantage. However, apart from a few speculative long-range efforts from the lively winger Xherdan Shaqiri, Basel's attack failed to trouble the confident Benfica keeper Artur. In the 31st minute Fabian Frei had the best FCB chance. However, despite being well placed, he headed Jacques Zoua's cross wide. After the break the home team did more for the game than they had before. Within a matter of minutes Rodrigo twice had the chance to increase the lead. First, he hit the ball over the top, after Aimar's good diagonal pass, then he headed Maxi Pereira's accurate cross straight into Sommer's hands. On 64 minutes Basel striker Scott Chipperfield raced down the left of the field. His low perfectly weighted cross was met by the onrushing captain Benjamin Huggel and he placed his superb shot inside Artur's right-hand post from the edge of  the penalty area. Benfica tried to react, but the 1–1 score line remained up until the final whistle from referee Carlos Velasco Carballo of the Royal Spanish Football Federation.

Oțelul Galați (22 November 2011)
Oțelul Galați played their home matches at Stadionul Național, Bucharest as their own Stadionul Oţelul did not meet UEFA criteria. It was a clear night, the pitch was dry and the temperature had dropped below the freezing point as referee Tom Harald Hagen of the Football Association of Norway blew the whistle to start the game in front of 5,787 fans. It was Otelul who took an immediate grip on the game. Laurenţiu Iorga's free-kick gave the home team their first good chance. The ball came quickly to defender Cristian Sârghi stood at the far post, but his header flew over the bar. Oţelul continued their pressing game, but it was a good move at the other end that gave the opening goal. On the 10th minute Alexander Frei played a neat ball forward to Marco Streller and he passed inside to Fabian Frei and his shot was hard and precise. Four minutes later the home team's offside trap did not work and Streller sprinted forwards into the gaining space. Captain Streller could have gone for goal himself, but unselfishly chipped the ball across for Alexander Frei who volleyed it into the net. In the 37th minute, defender Adrian Sălăgeanu's clearance hit Alexander Frei and the loose ball came to Streller, although he was under pressure from two defenders, he kept calm and easily beat the out rushing keeper Branko Grahovac. Three goals up at half-time, Basel spooled down the first 30 minutes of the second half without any worries. Exactly on 75 minutes captain Gabriel Giurgiu scored from the edge of the penalty area. The moods changed immediately and Oţelul found a new momentum. The Basel defence tried not to react too nervously, but six minutes later left-back Park Joo-Ho was far too casual inside the area, letting Liviu Antal round him and place his short out of reach for keeper Yann Sommer. Despite the tense final ten minutes Sommer was not beaten again and Basel could record a 3–2 victory.

Manchester United (7 December 2011)
The starting position for both clubs on matchday 6 in the sold-out St. Jakob Park with 36,894 fans was clear. With Benfica already assured of progress to the knock-out stage, Basel and Manchester United dualled together for their group second qualifying berth. United needed only a point and the hosts would only stay in the competition with a win. It was a cool evening and at times it rained after referee Björn Kuipers of the Royal Dutch Football Association blew his whistle for the kick-off. United started well their hopes were somewhat dashed as their defence failed to clear a Markus Steinhöfer cross from the right. The ball went to the far side Xherdan Shaqiri claimed it on the left and sent it hard and high back into the centre. Keeper David de Gea could not clear the ball far enough and captain Marco Streller slammed a fierce shot home to put the hosts a goal ahead after nine minutes. The early goal gave Basel an optimism and they played with a good momentum and they continued to press forwards. United struggled to control the Basel wingers Shaqiri to the right and Fabian Frei on the left. As the game commenced Nani became equally influential for the visitors. After 30 minutes he brought a good cross to the middle but both Wayne Rooney and Park Ji-Sung were unable to reach it. A few minutes late Nani's own effort was bravely smothered by Yann Sommer. Rooney had a second chance a few minutes later but the Basel keeper was equal to that too. United began the second half positively, but their increasing frustration was becoming obvious. All the more so, then as while trying to make a clearance, right-back Steinhöfer volleyed the ball against his own crossbar. Steinhöfer came away laughing and within minutes the Basel fans created a song to celebrate his feat. Basel created chances for themselves, Alexander Frei had one kick acrobatically saved. Then another counter-attack and Shaqiri played a neat cross from the right, Streller dummied by striding under the ball and Alexander Frei was there to head it home at the far post, with six minutes of play left. Although Phil Jones headed the ball home after Federico Macheda's shot had rebounded from the cross-bar, Basel survived a tense final two minutes to advance to the knock-out phase with the 2–1 win.

Conclusion
Basel played very impressive away games remaining undefeated, winning in Romania and drawing in Lisbon and Manchester. They finished the group in second place after a decisive home win against Manchester United and thus securing qualification for the knockout phase, the round of 16. The team had achieved their group stage aim with bravura.

Knockout phase
In the knockout phase, teams played against each other over two legs on a home-and-away basis, except for the one-match final. The draw for the round of 16 was held on 16 December 2011. In the draw for the round of 16, the eight group winners were seeded, and the eight group runners-up were unseeded. The seeded teams were drawn against the unseeded teams, with the seeded team hosting the second leg. Teams from the same group or the same association could not be drawn against each other. Basel were drawn against Bayern Munich.

Bayern Munich (22 February 2012)
The first leg in the round of 16 was played in the with 36,000 spectators sold-out St. Jakob-Park on a clear night with soft pitch under referee Nicola Rizzoli of the Italian Football Federation. Bayern began with purpose and just two minutes had passed as Franck Ribéry played into the box for Mario Gomez, but the angle created by the pass around goalkeeper Yann Sommer made finishing impossible. Within the opening quarter of an hour Ribéry twice had the opportunity to open the scoring, but he was denied by the good reacting keeper Sommer on both occasions. The hosts seemed to be content in letting the Bayern control possession, but as they played their counter-attacks they were always dangerous. In fact, the home team hit the goal frame twice with just a few minutes in the first period. First after a corner Aleksandar Dragović had a header deflected  onto the near post by keeper Manuel Neuer, then Alexander Frei fired his shot against the cross-bar, this time the keeper had no chance of reaching the ball. The closer the half time break came, Bayern's play became more and more ponderous and their movements were predictable. Marco Streller had the first chance in the second period, but his header landed harmlessly into Neuer's arms. Bayern controlled things, were dangerous, but not Successful with their efforts. Therefore Jupp Heynckes substituted in Thomas Müller for Ribéry in the later stages and it was his quickly played ball that gave Gomez another attempt at goal. But his angled effort was parried by the excellent reacting keeper Sommer. The visitors played more and more stagnant and suddenly Basel were able to take advantage four minutes from time. Only three minutes into the game, substitute Jacques Zoua and substitute Stocker combined perfectly, with Stocker pushing the ball beyond Neuer’
s reach to give the hosts a 1–0 victory.

Return match (13 March 2012)
Basel travelled to the Allianz Arena for the second leg with optimismus. The stadium was sold-out with 66,000 fans on this cloudy evening and the pitch was described as dry as referee  Mark Clattenburg  from the Football Association blew his whistle for the kick-off. Bit Basel's 1-0 aggregate lead was wiped out after 10 minutes by Arjen Robben and after the home team had dominated most of the match, Bayern seized complete control with two further goals from Thomas Müller and from Mario Gomez shortly before the break. By this time the match could be considered as decided, because then Bayern played themselves into an ecstasy after the break. Gomez scored four goals as Bayern cruised into the quarter-finals with a record-breaking victory. Robben rounded off a memorable night for the home team with his second goal after 81 minutes.

Conclusion
Bayern advanced to the next round, they then advanced as far as the final. But here they were defeated Chelsea after a penalty shoot-out.

Basel's Champions League came to an end, following good results in the group stage and a good result in the first leg of the round of 16, with a disappointing match in the second leg. Nevertheless, the team had achieved their European aim.

Players

First team
The following is the list of the Basel first team squad. It also includes players that were in the squad the day the season started on 16 July 2011 but subsequently left the club after that date.

Summer transfers

In

Out

Results and fixtures

Friendlies

Pre-season

Uhrencup
The Uhrencup is a club football tournament, held annually in Grenchen.

Mid-season

Winter break and Mid-season

Swiss Super League

Kickoff times are in CET

First half of season

Second half of season
Neuchâtel Xamax had their license revoked during the winter break, the club's second-half matches were cancelled entirely. The Swiss Football Association competed the second half of the season with only nine clubs. The remaining nine played another double round-robin schedule. Each of the nine clubs had then played 34 matches at the end of the season.

League table

Swiss Cup

UEFA Champions League

Group stage

Knockout phase

Statistics

Match statistics

References

Sources
 Rotblau: Jahrbuch Saison 2015/2016. Publisher: FC Basel Marketing AG. 
 Rotblau: Jahrbuch Saison 2017/2018. Publisher: FC Basel Marketing AG. 
 Die ersten 125 Jahre / 2018. Publisher: Josef Zindel im Friedrich Reinhardt Verlag, Basel. 
 Season 2011–12 at "Basler Fussballarchiv” homepage
 Switzerland 2011–12 at RSSSF

External links
 2011–12 FC Basel season at Soccerway

FC Basel seasons
Basel season
Basel
Swiss football championship-winning seasons